Mo Idrettslag is a football club from Mo i Rana, Norway.

History 
Mo IL was founded in 1904, as the first football club in Nord-Norge. In the first couple of years, Mo only played against teams with Englishmen working in the area, but on 7 June 1907 Ranen Kompani was beaten 2-1 in the first match between two teams from Nord-Norge.

One of the most memorable moments from the 2004-season was the 0-2. loss against Tromsø IL, fielding players such as Morten Gamst Pedersen in their starting eleven, in the third round of the 2004 Norwegian Football Cup. On their way to the third round, they beat the second tier team Strømsgodset IF 2-0.

Mo IL narrowly missed out on promotion to 1. divisjon in the 2005 season. Having led the table for much of the season, their promotion chances were ruined due to form declination during the season-ending fixtures.

Before the start of 2006 2. divisjon, there was a media-hype around Mo's chances for promotion. Mo IL got off to a horrendous start of the season, going through the eight first matches without one single victory. Media was speculating whether the current manager, Thor André Olsen, was going to be sacked. In an unlikely turn of events, a giant form leap during the autumn of 2006 took Mo from the very bottom of the table to a worthy fifth place at the season's end.

Mo was relegated from the 2. divisjon in 2010, but won their group in the 3. divisjon and won promotion in 2011. Again relegated in 2014, a victory in the 3. divisjon in 2015 led to another spell in the 2016 2. divisjon.

Notable former members include the football coaches Trond Sollied, Thor André Olsen and Charles Berstad, as well as the former football referee Jonny Ditlefsen.

Recent history 
{|class="wikitable"
|- style="background:#efefef;"
! Season
! 
! Pos.
! Pl.
! W
! D
! L
! GS
! GA
! P
!Cup
!Notes
|-
|2004
|2. divisjon
|align=right |4
|align=right|26||align=right|15||align=right|5||align=right|6
|align=right|51||align=right|30||align=right|50
|Third round
|
|-
|2005
|2. divisjon
|align=right |2
|align=right|26||align=right|15||align=right|2||align=right|9
|align=right|59||align=right|44||align=right|47
|Second round
|
|-
|2006
|2. divisjon
|align=right |5
|align=right|26||align=right|12||align=right|3||align=right|11
|align=right|60||align=right|48||align=right|39
|First round
|
|-
|2007
|2. divisjon
|align=right |8
|align=right|26||align=right|11||align=right|4||align=right|11
|align=right|38||align=right|43||align=right|37
|Third round
|
|-
|2008
|2. divisjon
|align=right |8
|align=right|26||align=right|11||align=right|3||align=right|12
|align=right|54||align=right|45||align=right|36
||Second round
|
|-
|2009
|2. divisjon
|align=right |11
|align=right|26||align=right|6||align=right|10||align=right|10
|align=right|40||align=right|55||align=right|28
||First round
|
|-
|2010
|2. divisjon
|  style="text-align:right; background:#fcc;"| 14
|align=right|26||align=right|3||align=right|4||align=right|19
|align=right|26||align=right|85||align=right|13
||First round
|Relegated to the 3. divisjon
|-
|2011 
|3. divisjon
|  style="text-align:right; background:#dfd;"| 1
|align=right|22||align=right|17||align=right|3||align=right|2
|align=right|79||align=right|22||align=right|54
||First round
|Promoted to the 2. divisjon
|-
|2012 
|2. divisjon
|align=right |9
|align=right|26||align=right|9||align=right|4||align=right|13
|align=right|41||align=right|49||align=right|31
|Second round
|
|-
|2013
|2. divisjon
|align=right |6
|align=right|26||align=right|12||align=right|4||align=right|10
|align=right|47||align=right|44||align=right|40
|First round
|
|-
|2014 
|2. divisjon
|  style="text-align:right; background:#fcc;"| 13
|align=right|26||align=right|3||align=right|4||align=right|19
|align=right|22||align=right|87||align=right|13
|Second round
|Relegated to the 3. divisjon
|-
|2015 
|3. divisjon
|  style="text-align:right; background:#dfd;"| 1
|align=right|22||align=right|18||align=right|3||align=right|1
|align=right|82||align=right|25||align=right|57
||First round
|Promoted to the 2. divisjon
|-
|2016 
|2. divisjon
|  style="text-align:right; background:#fcc;"| 14
|align=right|26||align=right|3||align=right|1||align=right|22
|align=right|31||align=right|94||align=right|10
||Second round
|Relegated to 3. divisjon
|-
|2017 
|3. divisjon
|  style="text-align:right; background:#fcc;"| 11
|align=right|26||align=right|10||align=right|4||align=right|12
|align=right|54||align=right|63||align=right|34
||First round
|Relegated to 4. divisjon
|-
|2018 
|4. divisjon
|align=right |3
|align=right|16||align=right|10||align=right|2||align=right|4
|align=right|58||align=right|19||align=right|32
||First round
|
|}

Other sections
In the past, Mo IL has had sections in other sports than football. From their now-defunct athletics section, Marit Hemstad participated in the European Championships. Famous politician Gerd-Liv Valla was a middle distance runner for Mo IL as a teenager.

References

External links
Mo Idrettslag results

Defunct football clubs in Norway
Defunct athletics clubs in Norway
Sport in Nordland
Rana, Norway
1904 establishments in Norway
2018 disestablishments in Norway
Association football clubs established in 1904
Association football clubs disestablished in 2018